James Stewart was a prolific American actor who appeared in a variety of film roles in Hollywood, primarily of The Golden Age of Hollywood in which in 1999, he was listed by the American Film Institute, as the third most popular male actor. From the beginning of his career in 1935 through his final theatrical project in 1991, Stewart appeared in more than 92 films, television programs, and shorts.

Stewart received several awards and nominations for his work.  
 
Eleven of his films have been preserved in the United States National Film Registry. He won the Academy Award for Best Actor for The Philadelphia Story whilst roles in Mr. Smith Goes to Washington, It's a Wonderful Life, Harvey and Anatomy of a Murder earned him Academy Award nominations. He also won a Golden Globe Award for his role in the television series Hawkins.

Film career

Directors
Stewart made his mark in screwball comedies, suspense thrillers, westerns and family comedies. He worked multiple times with directors such as Anthony Mann (Winchester '73, Bend of the River, Thunder Bay, The Naked Spur, The Glenn Miller Story, The Far Country, The Man from Laramie, and Strategic Air Command), Alfred Hitchcock (Rope, Rear Window, The Man Who Knew Too Much and Vertigo), John Ford (Two Rode Together, The Man Who Shot Liberty Valance and Cheyenne Autumn), and Frank Capra (It's A Wonderful Life, Mr. Smith Goes to Washington and You Can't Take it with You).

Directors he also worked with include Henry Hathaway (Call Northside 777 and How the West Was Won), Frank Borzage (The Mortal Storm), Ernst Lubitsch (The Shop around the Corner), Billy Wilder (The Spirit of St. Louis), and Otto Preminger (Anatomy of a Murder).

Actors
Actors with whom Stewart worked include John Wayne, Clark Gable, Cary Grant, Robert Taylor, Spencer Tracy,  Robert Mitchum, Charlton Heston, Rock Hudson, Lionel Barrymore, William Powell, Edward G. Robinson, Lee Marvin, Robert Ryan, Oliver Reed, Richard Widmark, Henry Fonda, and Harry Morgan.  
 
His leading ladies included Margaret Sullavan, Katharine Hepburn, Paulette Goddard, Joan Crawford, Jean Harlow, Joan Fontaine, Jean Arthur, Bette Davis, Hedy Lamarr, Marlene Dietrich, Grace Kelly, Kim Novak, Maureen O'Hara, Donna Reed, Ginger Rogers, Natalie Wood, Eleanor Powell, Doris Day, June Allyson, Janet Leigh, Claudette Colbert and Rosalind Russell.

Feature films

Box office ranking
For a number of years exhibitors voted James Stewart as among the most popular stars in the country:
1940 - 11th (US)
1941 - 13th (US)
1948 - 25th (US)
1949 – 11th (US)
1950 – 5th (US), 7th (UK)
1951 – 16th (US), 2nd (UK)
1952 – 6th (US), 8th (UK)
1953 – 7th (US)
1954 – 4th (US), 2nd (UK)
1955 – 1st (US), 2nd (UK)
1956 – 3rd (US), 2nd (UK)
1957 – 7th (US)
1958 – 9th (US)
1959 – 3rd (US)
1960 – 18th (US)
1961 – 22nd (US)
1962 – 13th (US)
1963 - 14th (US)
1964 - 23rd (US)
1965 - 8th (US)
1966 - 16th (US)
1970 - 17th (US)

Television appearances 
Stewart had made guest appearances on television, The Jack Benny Program, in the 1950s, but first starred in Flashing Spikes, an hour-long episode of Alcoa Premiere directed by John Ford. In the early 1970s, he transitioned his career from cinema to television. For the series Hawkins, Stewart received the Golden Globe Award for Best Actor – Television Series Drama. In 1972, Stewart reprised his role from the film Harvey in a television film of the same name.

Documentaries and short subject 

Incomplete listing.

See also 
 List of film collaborations
 List of awards and nominations received by James Stewart

References 

 General

 
 
 

 Specific

External links 
 

Male actor filmographies
American filmographies